Walter Steinbeck (26 September 1878 – 27 August 1942) was a German film actor.

Steinbeck was born in Niederlößnitz (now Radebeul), Saxony, Germany. He died at age 63 in Berlin, Germany.

Selected filmography

 The Romance of a Poor Sinner (1922)
 The Chain Clinks (1923)
 Night of Mystery (1927)
 Panic (1928)
 Sixteen Daughters and No Father (1928)
 The Great Longing (1930) - film director
 Her Majesty the Barmaid (1931)
 Marriage with Limited Liability (1931)
 Weekend in Paradise (1931)
 24 Hours in the Life of a Woman (1931)
 Louise, Queen of Prussia (1931)
 In the Employ of the Secret Service (1931)
 Thea Roland (1932)
 Impossible Love (1932)
 The Blue of Heaven (1932)
 A Tremendously Rich Man (1932)
 Johnny Steals Europe (1932)
 The Mad Bomberg (1932)
 All is at Stake (1932)
 When Love Sets the Fashion (1932)
 Five from the Jazz Band (1932)
 Trenck (1932)
 Chauffeur Antoinette (1932)
 The Pride of Company Three (1932)
 The Page from the Dalmasse Hotel (1933)
 The House of Dora Green (1933)
 A Door Opens (1933)
 Laughing Heirs (1933)
 Dream of the Rhine (1933)
 Love Must Be Understood (1933)
 Gretel Wins First Prize (1933)
 The Big Bluff (1933)
 The Country Schoolmaster (1933)
 Gold (1934)
 The Brenken Case (1934)
 Holiday From Myself (1934)
 The Two Seals (1934)
 Police Report (1934)
 The Last Waltz (1934)
 Mother and Child (1934)
 Winter Night's Dream (1935)
 The Old and the Young King (1935)
 She and the Three (1935)
 His Late Excellency (1935)
 Dinner Is Served (1936)
 Love's Awakening (1936)
 Paul and Pauline (1936)
 The Night With the Emperor (1936)
 Hilde and the Volkswagen (1936)
 The Empress's Favourite (1936)
 The Dreamer (1936)
 Premiere (1937)
 The Glass Ball (1937)
 Autobus S (1937)
 The Coral Princess (1937)
 Monika (1938)
 The Great and the Little Love (1938)
 Freight from Baltimore (1938)
 Nanon (1938)
 Red Orchids (1938)
 Der singende Tor (1939)
 In the Name of the People (1939)
 Charivan (1941)
 Gasman (1941)
  (1941)
 The Thing About Styx (1942)
 The Night in Venice (1942)
 Bismarck's Dismissal (1942)
 Wedding in Barenhof (1942)
 Titanic (1943)

Bibliography
 Gemünden, Gerd. A Foreign Affair: Billy Wilder's American Films. Berghahn Books, 2008.

External links

1878 births
1942 deaths
German male film actors
German male silent film actors
German male television actors
People from Meissen
20th-century German male actors